Duchess Anna of Prussia and Jülich-Cleves-Berg (3 July 1576 – 30 August 1625) was Electress consort of Brandenburg and Duchess consort of Prussia by marriage to John Sigismund, Elector of Brandenburg. She was the daughter of Albert Frederick, Duke of Prussia, and Marie Eleonore of Cleves.

Biography
Anna was married to John Sigismund on 30 October 1594. Anna was described as intellectually superior to her spouse, temperamental and strong-willed. She is reported to have thrown plates and glasses at her spouse during arguments. She fought on her own to secure her succession rights to various fiefs and handled negotiations with her competitors. In 1612, she placed her demands before the Emperor. After the conversion of her spouse to Calvinism, Anna became the protector and spokesperson of the Lutherans. She continued to play an important role during the reign of her son. She opposed the Habsburgs and secured the marriage of her daughter Maria Eleonora to King Gustavus Adolphus of Sweden against her son's will in 1620.

Issue
 George William (13 November 1595 – 1 December 1640); successor of John Sigismund.
 Anne Sophia of Brandenburg (15 March 1598 – 19 December 1659); married Frederick Ulrich, Duke of Brunswick-Lüneburg.
 Maria Eleonora of Brandenburg (11 November 1599 – 28 March 1655); married Gustavus Adolphus of Sweden. They were parents of Christina of Sweden.
 Catherine of Brandenburg (28 May 1602 – 27 August 1644); married first Gabriel Bethlen, Prince of Transylvania and secondly Franz Karl of Saxe-Lauenburg.
 Joachim Sigismund of Brandenburg (25 July 1603 – 22 February 1625).
 Agnes of Brandenburg (31 August 1606 – 12 March 1607).
 John Frederick of Brandenburg (18 August 1607 – 1 March 1608).
 Albrecht Christian of Brandenburg (7–14 March 1609).

References

|-

|-

1576 births
1625 deaths
House of Hohenzollern
Consorts of Brandenburg
Prussian royal consorts
Electresses of Brandenburg
17th-century Prussian people
17th-century Prussian women
Daughters of monarchs